The Aphnaeinae are a subfamily of butterflies in the family Lycaenidae.

Systematics
Until recently, this taxon used to be considered a tribe (called Aphnaeini) within the subfamily Theclinae.

Genera
Modern authors recognize 17 genera:
 Aloeides Hübner, [1819]
 Aphnaeus Hübner, [1819]
 Argyraspodes Tite & Dickson, 1973
 Axiocerses Hübner, [1819]
 Cesa Seven, 1997
 Chloroselas Butler, [1886]
 Chrysoritis Butler, [1898]
 Cigaritis Donzel, 1847
 Crudaria Wallengren, 1875
 Erikssonia Trimen, 1891
 Lipaphnaeus Aurivillius, 1916
 Phasis Hübner, [1819]
 Pseudaletis Druce, 1888
 Trimenia Tite & Dickson, 1973
 Tylopaedia Tite & Dickson, 1973
 Vansomerenia Heath, 1997
 Zeritis Boisduval, [1836]

References

 
Butterfly subfamilies